Witki may refer to the following places:
Witki, Pułtusk County in Masovian Voivodeship (east-central Poland)
Witki, Warsaw West County in Masovian Voivodeship (east-central Poland)
Witki, Subcarpathian Voivodeship (south-east Poland)
Witki, Greater Poland Voivodeship (west-central Poland)
Witki, Warmian-Masurian Voivodeship (north Poland)